is a Japanese professional baseball pitcher. He previously played for the Yomiuri Giants and Hokkaido Nippon-Ham Fighters of Nippon Professional Baseball (NPB) and for the Cleveland Indians of Major League Baseball (MLB).

Career

Yomiuri Giants
Murata attended Osaka Taiiku University. In 2007, he was selected by the Yomiuri Giants of Nippon Professional Baseball in the first round of the Japanese Draft and spent three years pitching in ni-gun—the Japanese minor league—before being released.

Cleveland Indians
Murata joined the Cleveland Indians on December 19, 2010, though his American career began before that—he pitched nine games for the Scottsdale Scorpions of the Arizona Fall League in 2009 and was named a "Rising Star." In 2011, he made his professional debut, going 3–2 with 58 strikeouts, 37 hits, 10 walks and a 2.36 ERA in 49 2/3 innings for the HIgh-A Kinston Indians. Between the High-A Carolina Mudcats, Double-A Akron Aeros and Triple-A Columbus Clippers in 2012, the hurler was 3–2 with a 2.89 ERA in 27 games (10 starts). In 74 2/3 innings, he allowed only 68 hits and 22 walks while striking out 66 batters. With Akron and Columbus in 2013, Murata was 6–9 with a 4.44 ERA in 28 starts. In 158 innings, he walked only 29 batters. In 2014, he was 10–7 with a 5.04 ERA in 27 games (20 starts) between Akron and Columbus. He allowed only 38 walks in 126 2/3 innings.

Murata also played professionally in Panama and Venezuela. He throws two fastballs, a cutter, a forkball, a slider, a curveball and changeup. Murata was called up to the major leagues for the first time in his career on June 28, 2015, to start against the Baltimore Orioles as the 26th man on the roster for a doubleheader. After pitching in that one game, he was returned to Triple-A Columbus. On July 31, Murata was outrighted off of the 40-man roster. He finished the year in Columbus, posting a 15-4 record and 2.90 ERA in 27 appearances. He returned to Columbus in 2016, where he logged a 9-4 record and 3.78 ERA with 62 strikeouts in 102.1 innings of work. On November 18, 2016, he was released by the organization so he could return to Japan.

Hokkaido Nippon-Ham Fighters
On November 18, 2016, Murata signed with the Hokkaido Nippon-Ham Fighters and returned to Nippon Professional Baseball. For the 2017 season, Murata logged a 1-2 record and 2.77 ERA in 15 appearances. The next year, Murata pitched to a 6-3 record and 3.27 ERA with 45 strikeouts in 77.0 innings of work. In 2019, Murata pitched in 13 games for the Fighters, recording a 3.18 ERA with 28 strikeouts. In 2020, Murata logged a 3.55 ERA with 23 strikeouts in 38.0 innings pitched across 21 appearances. On December 2, 2020, he became a free agent. On December 24, Murata re-signed with the Fighters. He was released by Nippon-Ham on November 2, 2021.

References

External links

 
 
 His blog 

1985 births
Living people
Akron Aeros players
Akron RubberDucks players
Baseball people from Osaka Prefecture
Caribes de Anzoátegui players
Carolina Mudcats players
Cleveland Indians players
Columbus Clippers players
Hokkaido Nippon-Ham Fighters players
Japanese expatriate baseball players in the United States
Kinston Indians players
Major League Baseball pitchers
Major League Baseball players from Japan
Navegantes del Magallanes players
Japanese expatriate baseball players in Venezuela
Nippon Professional Baseball pitchers
People from Kumatori, Osaka
Scottsdale Scorpions players
Yomiuri Giants players
Expatriate baseball players in Panama
Japanese expatriate baseball players in New Zealand
Auckland Tuatara players